Anda is a Basque surname. Notable people with the surname include:

Alfonso de Anda, Mexican TV show host
Carlos de Anda, Mexican sprinter who competed in the 1932 Summer Olympics
Carr Van Anda, managing editor of The New York Times under Adolph Ochs
Gabriel de Anda, former Mexican soccer player
Géza Anda, Hungarian pianist
Randi Anda, Norwegian politician for the Christian Democratic Party
Rodolfo de Anda, Mexican actor most well known for his roles in the film La gran aventura del Zorro
Torleiv Anda (1921–2013), Norwegian diplomat and politician